Fabio Bonci (born January 31, 1949 in Modena) is a retired Italian professional football player.

Bonci played for Serie A's Parma during the 1970s.

His father, Iro Bonci, and uncles Adler Bonci, Emilio Bonci and Remo Bonci all played football professionally.

References

1949 births
Living people
Italian footballers
Serie A players
Serie B players
Serie C players
A.C. Reggiana 1919 players
Juventus F.C. players
S.S.D. Varese Calcio players
Mantova 1911 players
Parma Calcio 1913 players
A.C. Perugia Calcio players
Atalanta B.C. players
Genoa C.F.C. players
A.C. Cesena players
Association football forwards